T40 or T-40 may refer to :

 T40/M9 Tank Destroyer, a United States tank
 T-40 tank, a World War II Soviet Union amphibious tank
 Allison T40, an early turboprop engine
 T40/M17 Whizbang, a United States tank-based rocket launcher
 T40 (classification), a disability sport classification
 ThinkPad T40, an IBM laptop